Ware & Leland v. Mobile County, 209 U.S. 405 (1908), is a case in which the United States Supreme Court held that contracts for the sales of cotton for future delivery that do not oblige interstate shipments are not subjects of interstate commerce. The Court also held that a state tax on persons engaged in buying and selling cotton for future delivery was not a regulation of interstate commerce, and that the imposition of the tax was not beyond the power of the state.

See also 
 Hartsville Oil Mill v. United States: military cotton contracts
 Southern Pacific Terminal Co. v. ICC: appeals on cotton shipments
 List of United States Supreme Court cases on commodity and futures regulation

References

External links

 

United States commodity and futures case law
United States Supreme Court cases
United States taxation and revenue case law
1908 in United States case law
Mobile County, Alabama
Cotton industry in the United States
United States Supreme Court cases of the Fuller Court